František Plánička (2 July 1904 – 20 July 1996) was a Czech football goalkeeper and one of the most honoured players in the history of Czechoslovak football. He played all his career for Slavia Prague, during which time the club won the Czech league eight times and the Mitropa Cup once. He also became a member of the Czechoslovakia national team, where his first success as a young goalkeeper was helping Czechoslovakia to become runner-up in the Central European International Cup 1931-32 and later became captain during the World Cup finals of 1934 (where the Czechoslovakia team finished second) and 1938.

Plánička was a courageous player, to the extent that in Czechoslovakia's 1938 World Cup match against Brazil, he remained on the field despite having suffered a serious injury. He was a goalkeeper of outstanding reflexes and shot-stopping abilities and was also characterized by his sportsmanship, never once being cautioned or sent off in his career. He was awarded the UNESCO International Fair Play Award in 1985.

Regarded as one of the greatest goalkeepers of his generation, and of all time, in 1999, the IFFHS elected him the best Czech goalkeeper – as well as the sixth best in Europe and the ninth best overall – of the twentieth century. In 2003, he was catalogued as the greatest goalkeeper of an era that included other notable keepers such as Ricardo Zamora and Gianpiero Combi.

Club career 
Born in Prague, Plánička played most of his footballing career and lived most of his life in the Czech capital. In the beginning of his career, Plánička played for the clubs Slovan Praha VII, Union VII, Staroměstský SK Olympia, and SK Bubeneč. He played for Slavia Prague from 1923 to 1938, in what has been one of the most successful eras in the club's history. During thirteen seasons with the club between 1925 and 1938, Slavia won seven league titles and Plánička played 196 league matches. He appeared in a total of 969 matches, of which Slavia won 742. Despite being of below-average height for a goalkeeper, at 1.72m (5 ft 8 in),<ref name="trivela"> [http://www.trivela.com/default.asp?pag=ExibirMateria&codMateria=1472&coluna=47 Planicka: Astro do 'fair play]  – by André Lacerda, trivela.com, 2006</ref> he was an effective shot stopper, and his acrobatic style earned him the nickname The Cat of Prague'''.

In 1932, Slavia reached the semifinals of the Mitropa Cup. In the first leg, they beat Juventus 4–0; in the second leg, Juventus had a 2–0 lead after which, according to RSSSF, Slavia resorted to obstruction and time wasting, which extended to the stands to the point that spectators started throwing stones on the pitch; one of the projectiles hit Plánička, causing him a serious injury. Slavia abandoned the pitch and the game stopped, and this led to their disqualification from the tournament.

Plánička also won six Bohemia cups (a domestic tournament) with Slavia, in 1926, 1927, 1928, 1930, 1932, and 1935. His only international title came in 1938, when his club finally won the Mitropa Cup.

 International career 
Between 1926 and 1938, Plánička played 73 times in goal for Czechoslovakia, a world record at the time and a national record that stood until 1966 when Ladislav Novák earned his 74th cap. Plánička was the national team captain 37 times. His international debut was on 17 January 1926 in a 1–3 loss against Italy.

 1934 World Cup 

Plánička helped Czechoslovakia qualify to the 1934 World Cup, and was the team's captain in the tournament. After beating Romania in the first round and Switzerland in quarterfinals, the Czech played a semifinal against Germany. The Czech took the lead early in the match, but Germany equalized in the second half when Plánička could not react to a long shot by Rudolf Noack. Czechoslovakia regained the lead and scored a third goal late in the game to win 3–1 and advance to the final.

On 10 June 1934 Czechoslovakia played the final against hosts Italy, who also had one of the great goalkeepers of the time, Gianpiero Combi, as its captain. The Czechs took the lead in the 71st minute with a goal by Antonín Puč, but ten minutes later a shot by Raimundo Orsi beat Plánička for the equalizer, sending the match to extra time, where goal by Angelo Schiavio gave the Italians the victory. Plánička finished the tournament with six goals against in four matches.

 1938 World Cup 

As Nazi Germany occupied Czechoslovakia, Plánička captained the Czechs again to the 1938 World Cup. In the first round, they beat the Netherlands 3–0 with all three goals coming in extra time. In the second round, they faced Brazil on 12 July, in what was one of the most violent matches in World Cup history, known as the "Battle of Bordeaux." One Czech and two Brazilian players were sent off, and players from both teams suffered serious injuries. With the game tied 1–1, Plánička's teammate Oldřich Nejedlý had to abandon the pitch with a broken leg, and then Plánička himself suffered a broken arm, after colliding with Brazil's striker Perácio's kick, as the Brazilian attempted to shoot. Plánička did not leave the pitch, however, and instead played through the pain until the end of regulation and through the subsequent extra time, which had no change in the score. – hinduonnet.com – The Hindu newspaper, India, 2002. The game was replayed two days later, and Czechoslovakia, without Plánička or forwards Nejedlý and Antonín Puč, lost 2–1 and was eliminated.

Plánička only conceded one goal in 240 minutes played, having the lowest goals against average with 0.38 goals per 90 minutes (better than Aldo Olivieri of champions Italy). He was selected to the Best XI of the tournament by a group of journalists. The match against Brazil in Bordeaux was the last one of Plánička's international career.

 After retirement 
Plánička continued to play football after his retirement, maintaining a healthy lifestyle and physical condition. On 4 July 1970 Plánička last played in goal in a senior team of former internationals. In 1985, UNESCO presented him with an Honorary Fair Play Award in recognition to his footballing career.

In 1994, after receiving a sports merit award, Plánička stated that he would like to see Slavia win the league while he was still alive. In the 1995–1996 season, after a 48-year wait, Slavia won the league title, and Plánička was able to celebrate it. Two months later, he died at the age of 92. At the time of his death, he was the last living member of the Czech squad at the 1934 World Cup and the last surviving player from either team to play in the final. Czech national team midfielder Karel Poborský attended his burial, postponing his contract signing with Manchester United, which was scheduled to happen the same day.

 Honours 
 Club 
SK Slavia Praha
 Czech league winner (8): 1925, 1928–29, 1929–30, 1930–31, 1932–33, 1933–34, 1934–35, 1936–37

 International 
Czechoslovakia
 FIFA World Cup Runner-up: 1934
 Central European International Cup: Runner-up: 1927-30

 Individual 
 FIFA World Cup All-Star Team: 1938
 FIFA World Cup Best Goalkeeper: 1938
 Berlin-Britz Goalkeeper of the Decade (1930s)
 UNESCO International Fair Play Award: 1985
 Czech Fair Play Award: 1994

 See also 
 List of men's footballers with the most official appearances
 List of one-club men in association football

 References and notes 

 External links 
 
 Sports Illustrated's World Cup Hall of Fame – Frantisek Planicka  – sportsillustrated.cnn.com – CNN/Sports Illustrated, 2003.
  
 Short article on Planicka – early years, playing qualities, quotes – www.ewige-wm-elf.de – Der Tagesspiegel Online'' 
 Summary of international appearances – by Jiří Slavík, RSSSF

1904 births
1996 deaths
Czech footballers
Czechoslovak footballers
Association football goalkeepers
SK Slavia Prague players
1934 FIFA World Cup players
1938 FIFA World Cup players
Footballers from Prague
Czechoslovakia international footballers
People from the Kingdom of Bohemia